Edna Oakes Simpson (October 26, 1891 – May 15, 1984) was a U.S. Representative from Illinois, wife of Sidney E. Simpson.

Born in Carrollton, Illinois, Edna
Simpson was elected as a Republican to the Eighty-sixth Congress (January 3, 1959 – January 3, 1961).
She did not seek renomination in 1960.
She was a resident of Carrollton, Illinois, until her death in Alton, Illinois, on May 15, 1984.

See also

 Women in the United States House of Representatives

References

External links
 

1891 births
1984 deaths
Female members of the United States House of Representatives
Women in Illinois politics
Republican Party members of the United States House of Representatives from Illinois
20th-century American politicians
20th-century American women politicians
People from Carrollton, Illinois